Les Fusillés is a transfer station serving the Line 1 of the Algiers Metro and is the western terminus of the Algiers tramway.

References

External links
 Algiers Metro Site
 Ligne 1 Algiers Metro on Structurae

Algiers Metro stations
Railway stations opened in 2011
21st-century architecture in Algeria